Denis Balla (born 28 August 1998) is an Albanian professional footballer who play as a defensive midfielder for Albanian club Partizani.

References

1998 births
Living people
Footballers from Tirana
Albanian footballers
Association football midfielders
Kategoria e Tretë players
Kategoria e Dytë players
Kategoria e Parë players
Kategoria Superiore players
Shkëndija Tiranë players
FK Partizani Tirana players